Samisoni Rabaka Nasigavesi (born 19 April 1969, in Nadi) is a Fijian former rugby union player who played as a scrum-half. His brother is the late Tomasi Rabaka, who was also a Fijian international.

Career
Grown up in the Votualevu village, in Nadi. He started his rugby career playing for the St.Mary's Rugby Club, before joining Dratabu Rugby Club and then, Airport Rugby Club. Rabaka played for the Nadi provincial team, which he captained. He first played for the Fiji national team during a test match against Samoa, in Suva, on 20 June 1992. He narrowly missed a place in the 1999 Rugby World Cup Fiji squad, however he traveled with the team as an emergency replacement for Jacob Rauluni. Rabaka was part of the Fiji roster for the 2003 Rugby World Cup, where he played the pool stage matches against France in Brisbane on 11 October and against Japan in Townsville, on 23 October, the latter being his last test cap for Fiji. In his career, he scored 29 points and 3 tries in aggregate. He also represented Fiji at sevens level.

Notes

External links

Sami Rabaka profile at Teivovo.com

Fiji international rugby union players
Fijian rugby sevens players
Fijian rugby union players
Rugby union scrum-halves
Sportspeople from Nadi
1969 births
Living people
I-Taukei Fijian people